HMAS Grantala was a hospital ship operated by the Royal Australian Navy (RAN) during World War I. She was launched in 1903 by Armstrong Whitworth Company for the Adelaide Steamship Company. The ship operated in Australian waters from 1903, and was requisitioned by the RAN on 7 August 1914. She was returned to her owners in 1915, then was sold and renamed Figuig. The ship was scrapped in 1934.

Operational history
Built by Armstrong Whitworth Company at their shipyard in Newcastle upon Tyne for the Adelaide Steamship Company, Grantala was launched in 1903. She was used as a passenger steamship on the Australian coastal runs and was capable of carrying 225 passengers. She arrived in Sydney from London on 10 March 1904.

Grantala was requisitioned by the RAN on 7 August 1914, and became Australia's first hospital ship and the only RAN hospital ship of World War I. HMAS Grantala was fitted out at Cockatoo Island Dockyard and Garden Island Naval Base. The ship's conversion took just 17 days, and upon completion she had the capacity to carry 250 to 300 patients, who were tended to by a staff of 59. During her short RAN service, she supported the Australian Naval and Military Expeditionary Force landing at Rabaul, which was later recognised with the battle honour "Rabaul 1914".

Grantala was returned to her owners in 1915, and was later sold to Red Funnell Shipping Company and renamed Figuig, before being sold to Compagnie Générale Transatlantique in 1920 and used on the passenger run between Marseilles and Algiers. She was sold for breaking up and was scrapped in Italy in 1934.

Citations

References

 Hospital ship No. VIII

1903 ships
Hospital ships of the Royal Australian Navy
Cruise ships
Hospital ships in World War I
Ships of the Compagnie Générale Transatlantique
Ships built on the River Tyne
Ships built by Armstrong Whitworth
Adelaide Steamship Company